Otto Lehmann (22 January 1889 in Berlin – 28 April 1968 in Munich ) was a German movie producer.

Career

Lehmann studied to be a teacher at the Lutheran seminary in Neuzelle. Upon graduation, he taught at primary and middle schools.

1925 Born in Berlin, joined as production manager for film and worked in that capacity, among other things for Gerhard Lamprecht's elaborate history paintings arc Old Fritz, the early Conrad Veidt-talkies The man who committed the murder and I and the Empress, the musical blockbuster Walzerkrieg from the hand of Ludwig Berger, Reinhold Schünzel's divine comedy Amphitryon and most recently, in 1936, directed by Johannes Meyer, again for a cinematic homage to the Prussian King Frederick the Great, Fridericus.

In 1936, he became popular in the popular play The Violet of Potsdamer Platz to the production manager from 1938 until the war ended Lehmann worked for the Terra as a manufacturing or production group leader. In this capacity he was also responsible for the production of Jud Süß, the most notorious anti-Semitic film of the Third Reich.

After the war, Lehmann acted for the  East German DEFA as joint manager of the dubbing division of the old Tobis. His work as a production manager in 1947 he put away for a variety of West German firms, 1952-1955 exclusively for Carlton-film of the Munich-based producer Günther Stapenhorst.

At the age of 70, Lehmann ended his career in film production and worked until the fall of 1967 as production manager for television. He also occupied an official post, he was sometimes the first Chairperson of the Association of German production manager eV.

He is not to be confused with another Otto Lehmann, who briefly worked during the Second World War, as an actor in Swiss films.

Filmography 

 1936: Das Veilchen vom Potsdamer Platz
 1937: Meiseken
 1937: Ein Volksfeind 
 1937: Tango Notturno 
 1938: Secret Code LB 17
 1938: Freight from Baltimore
 1938: Liebelei und Liebe 
 1939: Escape in the Dark
 1939:  Central Rio 
 1939: Kornblumenblau 
 1939: Uproar in Damascus
 1940: Jud Süß
 1941: Leichte Muse 
 1941: Sein Sohn 
 1942: Front Theatre
 1942/43: Music in Salzburg (UA: 1944)
 1943/44: Seinerzeit zu meiner Zeit 
 1944: The Green Salon
 1944: Tierarzt Dr. Vlimmen (unfinished film)
 1947/48: Frauen, Masken und Dämonen (Documentary film)
 1949:  After the Rain Comes Sunshine
 1950: Two Times Lotte
 1951: Bluebeard
 1952: The Forester's Daughter
 1952: Alraune
 1952: The White Horse Inn
 1953: The Immortal Vagabond 
 1953: The Last Waltz
 1954: Cabaret 
 1955: Königswalzer 
 1956: Between Time and Eternity 
 1957: 
 1958: Ist Mama nicht fabelhaft? 
 1959: Liebe, Luft und lauter Lügen

References

1889 births
1968 deaths
German film producers
Film people from Berlin